The following is a list of symbols of the U.S. state of Texas.

Official designations and symbols

Other official designations

Pledge to the Texas flag
A pledge of allegiance to the Texas flag was established in 1933.

Ships

Four ships of the United States Navy and one in the Confederate States Navy have borne the name Texas:
 CSS Texas
 USS Texas (1892)
 USS Texas (BB-35)
 USS Texas (DLGN/CGN-39)
 USS Texas (SSN-775)

See also
Outline of Texas
List of U.S. state, district, and territorial insignia

References

External links

State symbols
Texas